Streethouse railway station serves the village of Streethouse in West Yorkshire, England.

The station was opened by West Yorkshire Metro and Regional Railways on 12 May 1992 when the line between Wakefield and Pontefract was re-opened to passenger traffic.

Service
From December 2017, Sunday trains were introduced. On Sunday, trains run two-hourly between Knottingley and Leeds via Wakefield.

References

External links

Railway stations in Wakefield
DfT Category F2 stations
Railway stations opened by British Rail
Railway stations in Great Britain opened in 1992
Northern franchise railway stations
Featherstone